Mikkel Hedegaard Christensen (born 3 July 1996) is a retired Danish professional footballer who played as a left back.

At the age of 22, Hedegaard announced his retirement due to several head injuries.

References

1996 births
Living people
Danish men's footballers
SønderjyskE Fodbold players
Danish Superliga players
Association football midfielders